Hubert Eaves III is a keyboardist, songwriter and record producer. In the early 1980s, he worked on hits by the dance act D-Train. He also did session work with Mtume.

Biography
Eaves was born in St. Paul, Minnesota, where he was taught piano by his father. He began his career in the 1970s as a session keyboard player for the band Mtume. He later produced for artists such as Miles Davis, Stephanie Mills, Madonna, Luther Vandross, Whitney Houston, Aretha Franklin and Phyllis Hyman.

In 1977, Eaves released his only solo album Esoteric Funk. During the 1980s he worked alongside James D-Train Williams as the duo D Train. They enjoyed success with the songs "You're the One for Me" and "Keep On". He later produced Williams' solo albums Miracles of the Heart (1986) and In Your Eyes (1988).

Discography

Solo work
 Esoteric Funk (1977)

With Gary Bartz
 I've Known Rivers and Other Bodies (Concord/Universal, 1973)

With Carlos Garnett
Journey to Enlightenment (Muse, 1974)
Let This Melody Ring On (Muse, 1975)

With René McLean
Watch Out (SteepleChase, 1975)

References

External links
 Hubert Eaves III at Discogs

Living people
Musicians from Saint Paul, Minnesota
Businesspeople from Saint Paul, Minnesota
Year of birth missing (living people)